Among the Ruins (translit. Bain El Atlal) is a 1959 Egyptian romance film directed by the Egyptian film director Ezz El-Dine Zulficar and produced by the Egyptian film producer Salah Zulfikar. The film is based on a novel written by Yusuf Sibai. The film stars Faten Hamama, Emad Hamdy and Salah Zulfikar. Hamama received an award for her performance and the film was listed in the Top 100 Egyptian films in 1996.

Plot 
(Faten Hamama) plays Mona a university student who falls in love with her professor, Mahmoud (Emad Hamdy), who is also a gifted writer. Mahmoud proposes to Mona but her mother refuses and Mona marries another man and leave Egypt. Years later after she returns to Egypt, Mona visits a sick Mahmoud in a hospital. Mahmoud expresses his love to Mona as he lies in his deathbed. And Mona’s son Kamal (Salah Zulfikar) falls in love with Mahmoud’s daughter Mona (Sophie Tharwat).

Cast 
Faten Hamama as Mona
Emad Hamdy as Mahmoud
Salah Zulfikar as Kamal
Fouad El-Mohandes as Abdel Moneim
Sophie Tharwat as Mona Mahmoud
Rawhiyya Khaled
Samiha Ayoub

References

External links 

1959 films
1950s Arabic-language films
1950s romance films
Egyptian black-and-white films
Egyptian romance films
Films directed by Ezz El-Dine Zulficar